Conor Delaney may refer to:
 Conor Delaney (hurler), Irish hurler
 Conor P. Delaney, Irish-American colorectal surgeon